Olivier Vadrot is a French artist and designer that studied architecture. In his work, he embraces many disciplines ranging from music, to scenography and public furniture. He is known for his mobile architecture and exploration of the ergonomy of ancient theatres. His works have been exhibited at Centre Pompidou and at the 2017 Biennale of Architecture in Lyon.

Personal life
Olivier Vadrot was born in Semur-en-Auxois (France) in 1970 and currently lives in Beaune, Burgundy.

Career
After having graduated with a degree in architecture from Lyon's school of architecture, Vadrot started out as an assistant to the Japanese architect Shigeru Ban in France. Working alongside Ban since 1998 through 2001, he took part in creating the Cap Canal project at Centre D'interprétation Du Canal De Bourgogne. He also assisted Daniel Buren in the realisation of "Construction" a site specific installation presented at the centre d’art Le Consortium in Dijon (June 5 - July 25, 1998).

La Salle de Bains
Aside from his architectural experience with Ban, in 1998, he founded (together with Lionel Mazelaygue and Gwenaël Morin) La Salle de Bains, a 25sqm alternative exhibition space in Lyon, France. Vadrot described the place as a way "to engage in a dialogue with artists of the past generation", and "to get back to uninhibited architectural and design practice". Sixty seven exhibitions were organised at La Salle de Bains in the period of 1999—2013, featuring artists such as Xavier Veilhan (2000), Olivier Mosset (2006), Gianni Motti (2007), Claude Closky (2003), Mrzyk & Moriceau (2006), Claude Lévêque (2002) and Matthew McCaslin (2002).

Cocktail Designers
Carrying on the multidisciplinary approach they had addressed during the previous years, in 2004, Vadrot and Mazelaygue founded the design group called 'Cocktail Designers', together with the two French graphic designers, Claire Moreux and Olivier Huz, with whom they had collaborated at La Salle de Bains. The same year, the group presented their first collection of objects named "Form Follows Function" at the experimental Galerie Roger Tator in Lyon, France. In the show, the group questioned the relationship between art and design by hijacking everyday shapes to create new ones. "I think some of our objects belong to both design and art, to the category we temporarily call "practical sculpture"", explained Vadrot in an interview to the French journalist Clément Nouet in 2006. "There is a long history of borrowings and references between art and design, the two disciplines mirror each other", he concluded. According to the journalist Olivier Reneau, the group adopted "the same aesthetic and conceptual concerns as those developed by the Dutch Droog Design and Moooi who work as much with recycling forms as with ideas." Following this first show, an updated version of "Form Follows Function" was also exhibited at La Chaufferie (Galerie de l'école supérieure des arts décoratifs - 5 rue de la Manufacture des Tabacs) in Strasbourg from January 13 and February 26, 2006.

Solo Career & Research over theatres
The first structure inspired by the shape of ancient theatres implemented by Vadrot was presented at the Villa Medici in Rome during his residency at the French Academy in 2011-2012. Named Circo Minimo, the project was intended as a nod to Rome's Circus Maximus and was designed to accommodate small-scale performances and debates. Subsequently, Vadrot visited several ancient theatres located in the Mediterranean region such as Delos, Priene and Syracuse, to study the ergonomy of their rows of seats. This research was expressed in the Hors Les Murs 2016 programme, organised by the Institut Français. Following these field trips, in 2016, he developed Cavea, a nomadic platform made of plywood for the National Centre for Visual Arts (CNAP) in Paris. In 2018, the project was used as a backdrop to the conferences organised by the Centre Pompidou in Paris in the frame of the exhibition “May 68 - General Assembly” as well as on the occasion of the FIAC 2018.

Initially limited to the study of Greek and Roman theatres, Vadrot's corpus gradually spread to the theatres of the Renaissance and contemporary architecture such as that designed by Le Corbusier on the roof of Unité d’Habitation. Reinterpreting the project of the Swiss architect, in June 2015, Vadrot launched Les Tribunes, a scenographic device conceived during the event “Make it work/The Negotiations Theatre” organised by the theatre of Nanterre-Amandiers.

Selected works
 Le Kiosque Électronique (2009)
 Minimo (2010)
 Précisions sur les Vagues, in collaboration with Célia Houdart and Sébastien Roux, coproduced by Centre dramatique national Orléans, Festival d’Avignon, Centre national de création musicale, Stanza (2012)
 Coulisses (2013)
 La Veille, in collaboration with Célia Houdart, Sébastien Roux, Yannick Fouassier, Laurent Poitrenaux (voice) and the students of the Comédie in Reims (2013)
 Totem et tattoo (2014)
 A Catalogue of Steps & Diary of an Image, in collaboration with DD Dorvillier (2014)
 Le Vertugadin (2015)
 Les Tribunes (2015)
 Flash collection (2016)
 Cavea (2016)
 Pentélique (2016)
 Faire, c’est dire, in collaboration with Tectoniques Architectes (2017)
 La guérite de Marie (2018)
 Minimo (exhibition, 2018)

links

References 

1970 births
Living people
20th-century French architects
21st-century French artists
French contemporary artists
People from Beaune